Ko Lay (born 31 October 1931) was mayor of Yangon from 1988 to 2003.

References

Burmese military personnel
Mayors of Yangon
1931 births
Defence Services Academy alumni
Living people